David Wijns (born 9 January 1987) is a Belgian footballer who currently plays for Heist in the Belgian First Amateur Division.

Career
Wijns started his professional football career with Heist in the Belgian Promotion, helping the team promote twice to end up in the Belgian Second Division before being transferred to Belgian Pro League team Kortrijk in 2011. For Kortrijk, he played 29 league games in two seasons, before moving back to his birth town to join OH Leuven in 2013. In August 2014, Wijns was loaned back to Heist for one season , with the loan eventually being made permanent following the 2014–15 season.

External links
 
 

1987 births
Living people
Belgian footballers
Challenger Pro League players
Belgian Pro League players
K.V. Kortrijk players
Oud-Heverlee Leuven players
K.S.K. Heist players
Footballers from Flemish Brabant
Association football defenders
Sportspeople from Leuven